Cristina Martinez is a Mexican chef and immigration activist in Philadelphia, Pennsylvania.

Martinez is a native of Capulhuac, Mexico, and she is an undocumented immigrant who crossed the border from Juárez into the United States. She found a job in Philadelphia as a pastry chef in an Italian restaurant, where she met and married Benjamin Miller, a U.S. citizen. Martinez was fired from the restaurant when they discovered her undocumented status, and she began cooking food for other Mexican workers in her apartment.

As demand grew for Martinez's home-made barbacoa, she and Miller began selling tacos from a pushcart on weekends. In 2015, they opened a permanent restaurant, South Philly Barbacoa. In 2016, Bon Appétit magazine named it one of the top ten best new restaurants in America.

Cristina and Miller are active in supporting undocumented immigrants in the restaurant industry, establishing an organization, the Popular Alliance for Undocumented Workers' Rights. In 2017, Univision produced a Spanish-language podcast about Martinez, called Mejor vete, Cristina ("You Better Leave, Cristina"), which won Mejor Cobertura Multimedia (Best Multimedia Coverage) at the 2018 Ortega y Gasset Awards. Martinez was also featured on an episode of the Netflix series Chef's Table in 2018.

In 2022, Martinez won a James Beard Foundation Award for Best Chef, Mid-Atlantic.

References 

Year of birth missing (living people)
Living people
Women chefs
Mexican chefs
Undocumented immigrants to the United States
James Beard Foundation Award winners